Webb City may refer to:
 Webb City, Arkansas
 Webb City, Missouri
 Webb City, Oklahoma
 Webb City, a song from the 1981 album Art Blakey in Sweden

See also
 Webb's City